Alfred Bruce "Speedy" Thompson (April 3, 1926, in Monroe, North Carolina – April 2, 1972, in Charlotte, North Carolina) was an American stock car racer in the NASCAR Grand National series from 1950 to 1971, capturing 20 wins along the way.

Racing career
He made his debut in 1950 and won two of the seven races he competed in 1953 in the #46 Buckshot Morris Oldsmobile (including the 1953 Wilkes 160). Thompson made 15 starts in 1955 and made a serious attack on the Championship the next year, competing in 42 races in Carl Kiekhaefer's factory-backed Chryslers and Dodges, winning eight times and finishing third in points. 1957 saw a switch to Hugh Babb's and his own Chevrolet's and another third-place result, capturing only two victories that year. Speedy drove his own Chevy for the entire 1958 season, and another third place was the reward for his four victories in 38 starts.

In 1957, he set the 500-mile speed record for stock cars with an average speed of 100.1 mph. This record was quickly broken by other drivers and by Speedy himself.  In 1959 he became a charter member of the "Pure Record Club" along with Fireball Roberts, Elmo Langley, and Richard Petty who set the fastest qualifying speed in each make of automobile competing.

Another third place in points came in 1959 from 29 starts in a variety of different cars, this time with no wins. 1959 would be his last full-time effort in the series (participating in 24 different racing events including the 1959 Hickory 250) and he left Grand National after the 1962 season, choosing to race at late models at local North Carolina short tracks. He returned to NASCAR's top series, then called the Winston Cup, in 1971 for the World 600 where he finished 16th.

Death
During a late model race on Easter Sunday, April 2, 1972, at Metrolina Fairgrounds in Charlotte, Thompson had a seizure on the 21st lap, causing him to crash into a rail.  He was pronounced dead on arrival at the hospital, one day before his 46th birthday.  The medical examiner said that he died of natural causes, an acute coronary occlusion.

Awards
He was inducted into the National Motorsports Press Association's Hall of Fame and the Georgia Automobile Racing Hall of Fame.

Motorsports career results

NASCAR
(key) (Bold – Pole position awarded by qualifying time. Italics – Pole position earned by points standings or practice time. * – Most laps led. ** – All laps led.)

Grand National Series

Daytona 500

Convertible Division

References

External links
Racer Profile: Speedy Thompson at InsiderRacingNews.com
 
 

1926 births
1972 deaths
Burials in North Carolina
NASCAR drivers
People from Monroe, North Carolina
Racing drivers from Charlotte, North Carolina
Racing drivers from North Carolina
Racing drivers who died while racing
Sports deaths in North Carolina